Grace Church, formerly the Grace Episcopal Church, is a historic Carpenter Gothic style church building located in Buena Vista, Chaffee County, Colorado. Originally built as an Episcopal church in 1889 by the Lannan Brothers, its Carpenter Gothic details include board and batten siding, lancet windows and door openings and buttresses. On January 20, 1978, it was added to the National Register of Historic Places. On February 7, 2007, the church received of the Colorado Historic Society's 21st Annual Stephen H. Hart Awards for its restoration of the interior and exterior of the building.

In 2002, Grace Episcopal Church and the local United Methodist congregation formed a federated congregation with the approval of their respective denominational authorities. The United Methodist Congregation now styles itself Grace United Methodist Faith Community. Each one retains its separate corporate organization while worshiping together. Services on the first and third Sundays are led by a United Methodist minister while services are the second and third Sundays are led by an Episcopal priest.

See also
National Register of Historic Places listings in Chaffee County, Colorado

References

External links

Churches on the National Register of Historic Places in Colorado
Carpenter Gothic church buildings in Colorado
Episcopal church buildings in Colorado
United Methodist churches in Colorado
Churches completed in 1889
19th-century Episcopal church buildings
Buildings and structures in Chaffee County, Colorado
Federated congregations in the United States
National Register of Historic Places in Chaffee County, Colorado